Abdul Taib bin Abu Bakar is a Malaysian politician. He was the Member of Johor State Legislative Assembly for Machap from 2013 to 2022.

Election results

Honours

Orders 

  :
  Member of the Order of the Defender of the Realm (AMN) (2014)
  :
  Sultan Ibrahim Medal (PIS)

References 

Year of birth missing (living people)
Living people
Place of birth missing (living people)
United Malays National Organisation politicians
Members of the Johor State Legislative Assembly

Members of the Order of the Defender of the Realm